Gedved is a small town with a population of 2,336 (1 January 2022), in Horsens Municipality located between Skanderborg and Horsens in the middle eastern Jutland in Denmark's Region Midtjylland.

Gedved is one of the fastest-growing towns in Denmark, with a 30% increase in population since 2006.

Notable people 
 Sigrid Neiiendam (1873 in Gedved – 1955) a Danish actress who played some 200 parts at the Royal Danish Theatre
 Charlotte Jakobsen (born 1981 in Gedved) a Danish sports shooter

References

Cities and towns in the Central Denmark Region
Horsens Municipality

fo:Gedved kommuna
it:Gedved
nl:Gedved
no:Gedved
pl:Gmina Gedved
pt:Gedved
sv:Gedveds kommun